Henry Carpenter Smither (July 28, 1873 – July 13, 1930) was a United States Army officer and American football coach. He served as the head football coach at the United States Military Academy from 1906 to 1907, compiling a record of 7–2–1.

Smither was born on July 28, 1873 at Fort Sill and was the son General Robert Gano Smither. He attended schools in Burlington, Iowa and graduated from West Point in 1897. Smither was a commanding officer during the Spanish–American War and the Philippine–American War. During World War I, he served as an adjutant to Peyton C. March, the Chief of Staff of the United States Army. Smither was promoted to brigadier general in 1925.

Smither died on July 13, 1930, at the Olney sanitarium in Lawrenceville, Illinois, following two operations for appendicitis.

Head coaching record

Notes

References

1873 births
1930 deaths
American military personnel of the Philippine–American War
American military personnel of the Spanish–American War
Army Black Knights football coaches
United States Army generals
United States Army personnel of World War I
United States Military Academy alumni
People from Burlington, Iowa
People from Fort Sill, Oklahoma
Coaches of American football from Iowa
Military personnel from Iowa
Deaths from appendicitis